TheMuseum (stylized THEMUSEUM, formerly the Waterloo Regional Children's Museum until 2010) is an art and technology museum in Kitchener, Ontario. It opened to the public in September 2003 after eight years of planning and fundraising. TheMuseum offers permanent interactive exhibits and rotating temporary exhibits designed for all ages.

Affiliations
TheMuseum is affiliated with: CMA,  CHIN, and Virtual Museum of Canada.

References

External links
 
THEMUSEUM

Children's museums in Canada
Museums established in 2003
Museums in Kitchener, Ontario
Tourist attractions in Kitchener, Ontario
2003 establishments in Ontario